This is a list of lighthouses in Cook Islands.

Lighthouses

See also
 Lists of lighthouses and lightvessels

References

External links
 

Lists of lighthouses
Lighthouses
Lighthouses in the Cook Islands
Lighthouses in Oceania
Lists of lighthouses by dependent territory